Gajadhar Hajarilal Somani was an Indian politician.  He was elected to the Lok Sabha, the lower house of the Parliament of India from Dausa, Rajasthan as a member of the Indian National Congress.

References

External links
Official biographical sketch in Parliament of India website

India MPs 1952–1957
India MPs 1957–1962
Lok Sabha members from Rajasthan
Indian National Congress politicians
1908 births
Year of death missing
Indian National Congress politicians from Rajasthan